Sardehat, also rendered as Sardekhat, may refer to:
 Sardehat-e Bayat Jafar
 Sardehat-e Sheykh